= The Paris Crash =

Australian musical group

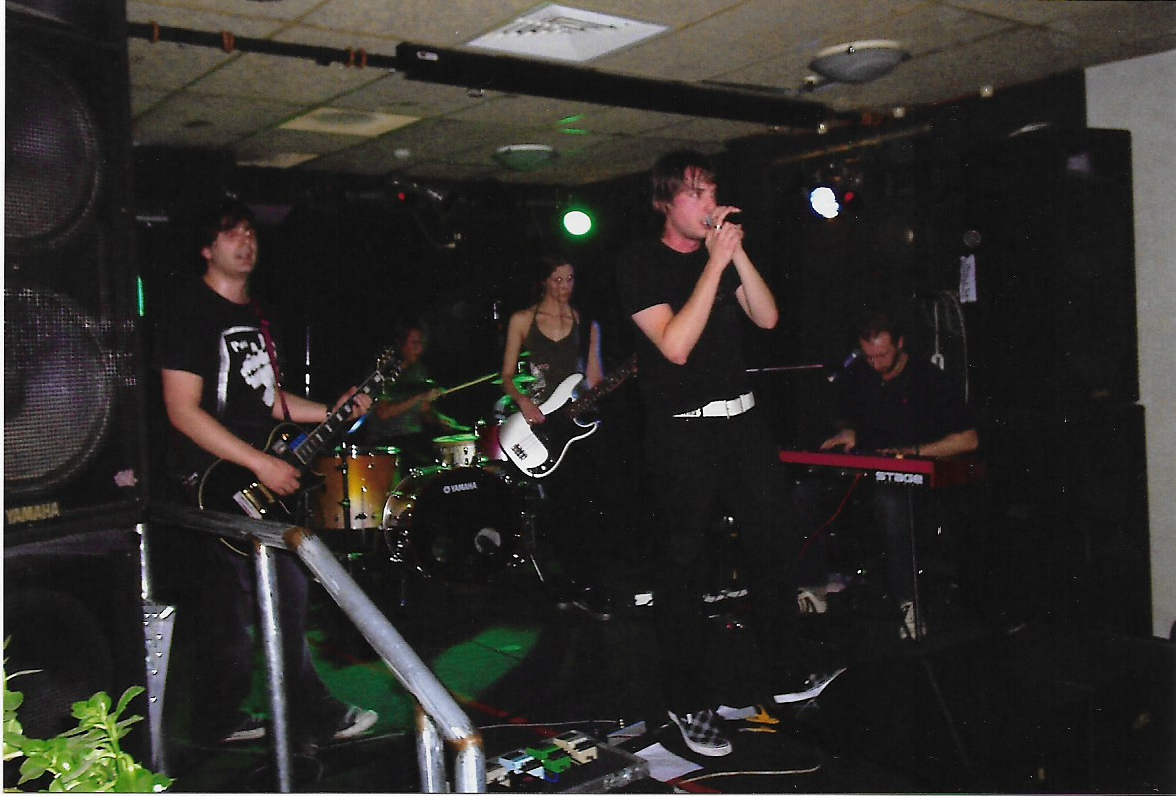
- The Paris Crash performing in Sydney, 2005

Background information
- Origin: Sydney, Australia
- Genres: Electronic rock
- Years active: 2005–present
- Labels: Silverback Records
- Members: Daniel Crash; Darren Crash; Nick Crash; Gareth Crash; Harley Crash

The Paris Crash is an electronic rock band based in Sydney, Australia, composed of lead vocalist Darren Crash, guitarist Daniel Crash, bass player Nick Crash, drummer Gareth Crash and keyboardist and backing vocalist Harley Crash.

The band came to prominence in 2010 with the release of their debut single "Honeymoon in Vegas" and subsequent national tour. "Honeymoon in Vegas" debuted at No. 2 in Australia on the ARIA Physical Singles chart and remained in the top fifty for six consecutive weeks, placing at number 48 on the 2010 year-end Physical Singles chart.

== Discography ==
=== Singles ===
List of singles, with selected chart positions
Title	Year	Peak chart positions
Title	Year	AUS Phy.
"Honeymoon in Vegas"	2010	2

=== Music videos ===
- "Honeymoon in Vegas" – debuted on Australian national television 15 May 2010
